A leadership spill of the Australian Labor Party (ALP), the official opposition party in the Parliament of Australia, was held on 28 January 2005. The outgoing Opposition Leader, Mark Latham, stood down 13 months after assuming the leadership in December 2003.  Kim Beazley was the only contender for the ballot, and was therefore elected unopposed.

Background

Mark Latham became leader in December 2003 after Simon Crean stood down after losing support from his caucus. However, Latham went on to lose the federal election in October 2004.

Latham stayed on as leader after the election until January 18, 2005 when he stood down, citing ill health.

Candidates
 Kim Beazley, former Leader, Member for Brand

Potential candidates who declined to run
The following individuals ruled themselves out as candidates or were the subject of media speculation but did not stand:
 Kevin Rudd, Shadow Minister for Foreign Affairs, Member for Griffith
 Julia Gillard, Shadow Minister for Health and Manager of Opposition Business in the House, Member for Lalor

See also
 2006 Australian Labor Party leadership spill
 2003 Australian Labor Party leadership spills

References

Labor Party leadership spill
Australian Labor Party leadership spills
Australian Labor Party leadership spill
Labor Party leadership spill